The Odeon Theater (Teatro Odeón in Spanish) was a theater in Buenos Aires, Argentina. It was built by Don Emilio Bieckert in the end of the 19th century. In July 1896, it hosted the first ever film screening in Argentina. It was demolished in 1991 in order to make space for the construction of a parking lot.

Currently the Odeon Tower is being built on the site, and a new theater is being built on one side of the tower to replace the former.

Major performances
1897, Maria Guerrero and Fernando Diaz de Mendoza 
1898, María Tubau 
1903, Carmen Cobeña, André Antoine
1907, Enrique Borrás 
1913, Leopoldo Lugones 
1927, Luigi Pirandello  
1937, Margarita Xirgu 
1950, Madeleine Renaud and Jean Louis Barrault 
1951, Diana Torrieri and Vittorio Gassman 
1954, Giorgio Strehler and Paolo Grassi
1962, Niní Marshall 
1967, Libertad Lamarque
1976, Nati Mistral

Principal concerts

Gallery

References

Theatres in Buenos Aires
Buildings and structures demolished in 1991
Argentine music
19th-century establishments in Argentina
National Historic Monuments of Argentina
Demolished buildings and structures in Argentina